Serious Japanese is the second studio album by Japanese hip-hop group Teriyaki Boyz. It was released on February 3, 2009. It peaked at number 3 on the Oricon Albums Chart.

Track listing

Charts

References

External links
 

2009 albums
Star Trak Entertainment albums
Albums produced by the Neptunes
Albums produced by Jermaine Dupri
Albums produced by Kanye West
Albums produced by Mark Ronson